Lydia Schenardi (born 27 June 1952 in Montreuil, Seine-Saint-Denis) is a French politician and Member of the European Parliament for the south-east of France. She is a member of the Front National, and is therefore a Non-Inscrit in the European Parliament. She sits on its Committee on Industry, Research and Energy and the Committee on Women's Rights and Gender Equality.

She is also a substitute for the Committee on Agriculture and Rural Development and a member of the delegation for relations with the Maghreb countries and the Arab Maghreb Union.

She was the FN candidate for mayor of Nice in the 2008 French municipal elections.

Career
 Member of the Île-de-France Regional Council (1998–2004)

External links
 European Parliament biography
 Declaration of financial interests (in French; PDF file)

1952 births
Living people
People from Montreuil, Seine-Saint-Denis
National Rally (France) MEPs
MEPs for South-East France 2004–2009
21st-century women MEPs for France